Wolf Rock may refer to:

Places
 Wolf Rock, Connecticut, United States
 Wolf Rock, Cornwall, England
 Wolf Rock, Lord Howe Island, Australia
 Wolf Rock (Queensland), Australia

Other uses
 Wolf Rock!, a 1993 album by Japanese rock band Guitar Wolf
 Wolf Rock TV, a 1984 animated series